The American Hiking Society is a Maryland-based non-profit dedicated to preserving trails, the areas that surround them and the hiking experience.  It was founded in 1976.

Programs
The American Hiking Society has three main avenues of action:
Volunteerism and Outreach including Volunteer Vacations, which began in 1978  to mobilize volunteers to work on trail maintenance, and National Trails Day, which is held the first Saturday every June to spread awareness and celebrate hiking.
Policy and Advocacy: working with Congress to develop hiker-friendly legislation and various federal agencies on implementation.
Trail grants and assistance: the Society provides grants to local organizations for building and maintaining trails, providing nearly $50,000 of funding in 2007.  Also, this organization heads up the Alliance of Hiking Organizations, a network of hiking and trail clubs from all over the country.

References

External links
Official website

See also 
Leave No Trace
National Trails System

Hiking organizations in the United States
Environmental organizations based in Maryland
1976 establishments in Maryland